In music, Op. 105 stands for Opus number 105. Compositions that are assigned this number include:

 Dvořák – String Quartet No. 14
 Mendelssohn – Piano Sonata No. 2
 Schumann – Violin Sonata No. 1
 Shostakovich – Moscow, Cheryomushki
 Sibelius – Symphony No. 7
 Weinberg – The Madonna and the Soldier